Ferenc Varga may refer to:
 Ferenc Varga (sculptor) (1906–1989)
 Ferenc Varga (athlete) (1925–2023)
 Frank Varga or Ferenc Csaba Varga (1943–2018), Hungarian-American sculptor
 , (singer), finalist on Megasztár

See also
Ferenc Vargha